Veerakurichi is a village in the Pattukkottai taluk of Thanjavur district, Tamil Nadu, India.

Demographics 

As per the 2001 census, Veerakurichi had a total population of 1927 with 940 males and 987 females. The sex ratio was 1050. The literacy rate was 64.78.

References 

 

Villages in Thanjavur district